Karla Bonoff is the RIAA Gold-certified first album by singer/songwriter Karla Bonoff. It includes several of Bonoff's compositions which had previously been prominently recorded: three by Linda Ronstadt ("Lose Again", "If He's Ever Near", "Someone to Lay Down Beside Me") and one by Bonnie Raitt ("Home").

Track listing
All songs written by Karla Bonoff, except where noted.

Reception
Rolling Stone's Stephen Holden called the album an impressive debut marred only by comparisons to Linda Ronstadt. Saying "Bonoff's approach is softer, plainer and more tentative." But concluding, "[t]he consistency of the material confirms a major writing talent; the performances show a promising singer."

AllMusic's William Ruhlmann noted retrospectively that "despite Bonoff's competent singing, which actually better accentuated the lyrics of her songs than Ronstadt's, it was hard for her to get out from under the shadow of the members of her peer group who had preceded her."

Personnel 
Karla Bonoff – lead vocals, piano (1, 3, 5, 10), acoustic guitar (7, 8, 9), backing vocals (2, 6, 8)
Kenny Edwards – electric guitar (8), acoustic guitar (2, 4, 9), bass guitar (5, 7, 8, 9, 10) mandolin (4), backing vocals (4, 7, 8, 10)
Andrew Gold – lead guitar electric guitar (2), acoustic guitar (4, 10) piano (4), clavinet (5), electric piano (6), harmonium (9), backing vocals (2)
Waddy Wachtel – electric guitar (1, 2, 6, 10) backing vocals (6)
Leland Sklar – bass guitar (1, 2, 6)
Russ Kunkel – drums (1, 2, 6)
Mike Botts – drums (5, 8, 10)
Steve Forman – percussion (1, 2, 6)
Dan Dugmore – steel guitar (4, 5, 8)
Linda Ronstadt – backing vocals (4, 10)
Wendy Waldman – backing vocals (5, 6)
Glenn Frey – backing vocals (7) 
J. D. Souther – backing vocals (7) 
Brock Walsh – backing vocals (4)
Jai Winding – piano (7)
Emory Gordy Jr. – bass guitar (4)
John Ware – drums (4)

References

1977 debut albums
Karla Bonoff albums
Columbia Records albums